Kochchikade South Grama Niladhari Division is a Grama Niladhari Division of the Colombo Divisional Secretariat of Colombo District of Western Province, Sri Lanka.

Methodist Church, Pettah, Grand Mosque of Colombo, Hameed Al Husseinie College, Kayman's Gate, Sri Lanka Law College, Wolvendaal Church, Hulftsdorp, Colombo Central Bus Station bombing, St. Thomas' Church, Colombo and Kotahena are located within, nearby or associated with Kochchikade South.

Kochchikade South is a surrounded by the Keselwatta, Masangasweediya, Aluthkade West, Jinthupitiya, Kochchikade North and Pettah Grama Niladhari Divisions.

Demographics

Ethnicity 

The Kochchikade South Grama Niladhari Division has a Moor majority (60.3%), a significant Sri Lankan Tamil population (21.1%) and a significant Sinhalese population (16.0%). In comparison, the Colombo Divisional Secretariat (which contains the Kochchikade South Grama Niladhari Division) has a Moor plurality (40.1%), a significant Sri Lankan Tamil population (31.1%) and a significant Sinhalese population (25.0%)

Religion 

The Kochchikade South Grama Niladhari Division has a Muslim majority (60.3%), a significant Hindu population (19.4%) and a significant Buddhist population (14.9%). In comparison, the Colombo Divisional Secretariat (which contains the Kochchikade South Grama Niladhari Division) has a Muslim plurality (41.8%), a significant Hindu population (22.7%), a significant Buddhist population (19.0%) and a significant Roman Catholic population (13.1%)

Gallery

References 

Grama Niladhari Divisions of Colombo Divisional Secretariat